Adi Thadi is a 2004 Indian Tamil-language action comedy film. It stars Sathyaraj, Abbas, Napoleon and Rathi. It was directed by T. Shivraj It was later remade in Telugu as Political Rowdy in 2005 with Mohan Babu, Charmee Kaur and Prakash Raj enacting the roles of Sathyaraj, Rathi and Napoleon respectively. Abbas reprises his role in the Telugu film.

Plot 
Tirupati (Sathyaraj) is a criminal who commands respect from state heads like the CM. He hates women and remains a bachelor even at the age of 50. A naughty college student Priya (Rathi) grabs Tirupati's attention though a beauty contest, and there he falls in love with her and proposes to her. Then, Priya's life turns to disaster because she gets tortured by Tirupati and his henchmen. With the help of his brother Surya (Napoleon), Tirupati changes his appearance to look younger. To escape from this problem, Priya contacts her boyfriend Arjun (Abbas). The rest is all about how all ends well.

Cast 
 Sathyaraj as Tirupati
 Napoleon as Surya
 Abbas as Arjun
 Rathi as Priya
 Sukanya
 Vaiyapuri
 Raj Kapoor
 Nighalgal Ravi
 Chitra Lakshmanan
 Vadivel David
 Devan
 Gemini Ganesan as himself

Soundtrack 
Soundtrack was composed by Deva and lyrics were written by Piraisoodan, Kalidasan, Snehan and Deva Kumar.

The song "Umma Umma" turned out to be a sensational chartbuster upon release.

Release and reception 
Sify wrote "Sathyaraj's Adithadi starts off as a rollkicking comedy that peters out towards the end. It is a black comedy, a movie that makes light of serious and usually morbid situations with their own level of hilarity and cleverness". The Hindu wrote "You could double up in laughter, guffaw at the hero's audacity or wrinkle your nose in disgust at certain points, but surely you cannot ignore the film that reminds you so much of the `villainous' Satyaraj of yore."

The relative success of the film prompted Shivraj and Sathyaraj to team up again for a film titled Devuda on fake godmen, though it was later shelved. Soon after, Shivraj began making Enakke Enakka with a new cast, but it was also cancelled.

References 

Tamil films remade in other languages
2004 films
Films scored by Deva (composer)
2000s Tamil-language films
Indian action comedy films
2004 action comedy films